Los Altos Airport, also known as Quetzaltenango Airport, serves the city of Quetzaltenango, also known as "Xelajú" or "Xela," and western Guatemala. It is operated and administrated by Dirección General de Aeronáutica Civil de Guatemala (DGAC).
In 2016, the airport handled 2,937 passengers.

General 
Los Altos Airport is in a high elevation basin in the Guatemalan highlands, in the northeastern part of the city of Quetzaltenango.

History
The first airport was built in 1945 at La Esperanza and was transferred to the present site in 1955. Aviateca had daily flights between Xela and Guatemala City, charging 25 Quetzal those days.

The airport has undergone construction work as part of a nationwide airport rehabilitation program. Serving Guatemala's second largest city, the airport aims to gain international status, along with La Aurora International Airport and Mundo Maya International Airport. The region hopes to profit economically from this new airport. Until 2006, the airfield had only a grass runway. It had no significant terminal building and only a small hangar. Air traffic was limited due to lack of features for safe operation. In September 2006 construction work began, which included: extension, asphalting, signposting, and illuminating of the runway and taxiway,
construction of a small terminal building and apron for four aircraft, and
construction of a parking area.

An emergency operations center has been installed at the airport in order to respond to future disasters like hurricane Stan. The new runway was inaugurated by President Óscar Berger on January 10, 2008.

However, there were criticisms. 
It was discovered that when Óscar Berger inaugurated the runway in January 2008, construction work had not finished. The temporary runway markings were for the official opening ceremony and had to be removed for final coating.
The terminal building was revealed to be only a small house, not a terminal building of international standards as anticipated .
The tower has not been built, hence safe operations were questionable.

Quetzaltenango 1

In 1992 Miguel Angel Castro Conde father and son constructed a two-seater aircraft in Quetzaltenango, finishing it in 2003 and naming it "Quetzaltenango 1". It is said that it is the first and only ever built airplane in Central America. On May 12, 2003 the first flight occurred lasting 30 minutes, followed by further testing.

Airlines and destinations

Statistics

Accidents

On 1 November 1998 a Douglas DC-3 (N3FY) carrying 18 crew and passengers crashed near the airport into mountainous terrain. Bad weather during approach is the probable cause. There were 11 fatalities.

On 13 October 1999 a private Bell 206 helicopter (TG-AMA) crashed near Quetzaltenango. Both occupants were killed.

See also
 Transport in Guatemala
 List of airports in Guatemala

References

External links 
 Dirección General de Aeronáutica Civil
 SkyVector - Quetzaltenango Airport
 
 

Airports in Guatemala
Quetzaltenango Department
Quetzaltenango